Bokhvan (also Romanized as Bokhvān) is a village in Fareghan Rural District, Fareghan District, Hajjiabad County, Hormozgan Province, Iran. At the 2006 census, its population was 205, in 60 families.

References 

Populated places in Hajjiabad County